Romano's Macaroni Grill is a casual dining restaurant chain specializing in Italian-American cuisine. The company claims 40 locations in the U.S. and is headquartered in Denver, Colorado.

History
Romano's first restaurant was founded by restaurateur Philip J. Romano in Leon Springs, Texas (now a district of San Antonio), on April 19, 1988. The location would later be occupied by Burkle's The Grill at Leon Springs, which closed in May of 2021 after a fire.

Brinker International, Inc. bought the franchise rights to the company on November 22, 1989.

Brinker announced on August 8, 2007, that it would begin exploring a buyer for the 230 company-owned stores. On December 18, 2008, Brinker announced that a majority stake in the chain was sold to Mac Acquisition LLC, an affiliate of Golden Gate Capital. As of June 29, 2011, Brinker still holds a 15.6% minority interest in the concept.

On February 6, 2013, Ignite Restaurant Group announced the acquisition of Romano's Macaroni Grill from Golden Gate Capital through a $55.0 million all-cash transaction. Redrock Partners LLC purchased the concept from Ignite in April 2015 for $8 million.

On October 18, 2017, Romano's Macaroni Grill filed for Chapter 11 bankruptcy protection.

On September 21, 2018, Romano's bought Sullivan's Steakhouse for $32 million.

Products
Romano's Macaroni Grill menu features items found in traditional cuisine from Italy and the Mediterranean area. The menu includes a custom-assembled pasta dish, with a choice of pastas, sauces, and toppings. Meals are served with complimentary bread and olive oil.  The chain touts its sourcing of various ingredients directly from family-owned businesses in Italy for quality, flavor, and business transparency.

In addition to their restaurants, the brand also features a line of packaged food products based on dishes offered by the restaurant. The packages are manufactured by General Mills Restaurant Favorites line.

Nutrition
In 2007, Men's Health rated Romano's Macaroni Grill one of the unhealthiest restaurant chains, giving it an 'F' on its "Restaurant Report Card."  According to the report, an average meal from the chain contains over 1,000 calories.  Three years later, however, the magazine rated Macaroni Grill as the healthiest Italian chain, noting that a number of entrees had significantly decreased in calorie count.  This was attributed to the hiring of a new CEO with a "multiphase plan to improve the nutritional quality."

Gallery

References

External links
 
 Official website

Companies based in Dallas
Companies based in Denver
Restaurants established in 1988
Restaurant chains in the United States
Italian-American culture in Texas
1988 establishments in Texas
2013 mergers and acquisitions
2015 mergers and acquisitions
Companies that filed for Chapter 11 bankruptcy in 2017
Italian-American cuisine